Somerton School District 11 is a school district in Yuma County, Arizona, United States. It operates five elementary schools and one middle school in the city of Somerton

References

External links
 

School districts in Yuma County, Arizona